The Blue Angels Motorcycle Club (BAMC) is an international outlaw motorcycle club formed in Glasgow, Scotland in 1963. The Blue Angels MC is the oldest outlaw biker club in Europe, and one of the largest and most powerful clubs in the United Kingdom. The club has chapters in Scotland, England, Belgium and Spain.

The Blue Angels have been linked with organised crime, and have been designated a criminal motorcycle gang by the Federal Police of Belgium.

History

Founded in the Maryhill area of Glasgow by Allan Morrison and Billy "Stone" Gordon in 1963, the Blue Angels Motorcycle Club is the oldest outlaw biker club in Europe. There are claims that "Blue" stands for "bastards, lunatics, undesirables and eccentrics", although this is almost certainly a backronym and the name more simply originates from the colour of the Saltire. The Blue Angels emerged from Glasgow's gang culture of the era, which saw various groups fighting over control of the city's rackets. From the club's inception in the 1960s, the Blue Angels were involved in clashes with mods and Glasgow street gangs.

The Blue Angels began associating with motorcycle clubs in England during the 1970s, forming an alliance with the Road Rats of London, and rivaling the English Hells Angels; Scotland remains one of the few countries in Europe without a Hells Angels chapter. In a 2007 interview with The Scotsman, BAMC president Lenny "the Lion" Reynolds stated: "We're proud of the fact that there isn't an American influence in Scotland. We fought the Hells Angels in the 1970s which is why they don't have a chapter here." The club established chapters in the Yorkshire cities of Leeds and Sheffield in 1970. An additional chapter in London disbanded shortly after its inception. The Blue Angels expanded into Belgium in 1992 after "patching over" a previously independent Belgian club of the same name which had been founded in Herzele in 1978.

In November 2016, Kris "Bokky" De Saedeleer, who had served as the president of the Blue Angels' Belgian chapters for 22 years, was expelled for allegedly embezzling funds from the club as well as founding an unsanctioned Nomads chapter.

The club's co-founder and former president Allan Morrison died from chronic obstructive pulmonary disease on 29 January 2020, aged 77. His funeral in Glasgow on 15 February 2020 was attended by around 400 bikers from across Europe.

Insignia
The Blue Angels' "colours" originally consisted of the clubs' insignia — a winged skull wearing a Waffen-SS helmet — and the words "Blue Angels" in Gothic script, along with "1%" patches, embroidered onto blue denim jackets. The term "one-percenter" is a reference to an alleged comment by the American Motorcycle Association that that 99 per cent of motorcyclists are decent and law-abiding, while one per cent are not. To celebrate the club's 50th anniversary in 2013, Blue Angels members began wearing a more traditional top "rocker", bearing the club's name, and bottom "rocker", denoting the country the member is from. The Blue Angels' insignia was legally protected in 1997. The club is also known as the "Blue Gang", and uses the abbreviation "21" (the numbers stand for the respective positions in the alphabet of B and A). Blue Angels mottos include "Blue Angels Forever, Forever Blue Angels ("BAFFBA"); "Blue Angels OK"; "Blue Gang Forver" ("BGF"); and "Blue Angels, best in the west".

Membership and organisation
Prospective Blue Angels members must be nominated by two members of the club and can be voted into the club by other members after serving a period of time as a "prospect". The Blue Angels do not permit drug addicts as members. The club has six chapters in Scotland, four in northern England, seven in Belgium and two in Spain. The Blue Angels have approximately 200 members in Scotland alone. The BAMC support club Tribe 21 also has twelve chapters in Scotland.

Criminal allegations and incidents

Belgium

The Gendarmerie carried out numerous operations against the Blue Angels in 1996. In March 1999, thirty-three members were sentenced to prison, received suspended sentences or were fined for possession of weapons or narcotics, assault and battery, theft, fraud, hostage-taking and criminal conspiracy, while two were acquitted.

In 2003, 19 members of a rival gang were hospitalised in a retaliation attack after two Blue Angels bikers were shot.

In May 2009, Belgium's Federal Police named the Blue Angels as one of four criminal motorcycle gangs operating in the country, along with the Bandidos, Hells Angels and Outlaws.

Two club members were arrested for stealing insulation material from a building site in Erpe-Mere in July 2010. The men allegedly intended to use the stolen material to insulate their clubhouse.

Blue Angels members were questioned by police after a man who was ejected from the Blue Angels clubhouse in Roeselare and later returned armed with an iron bar was hospitalized with a head injury on 7 June 2014. The man was convicted of possessing an illegal weapon and was also the victim of an arson attack at his home on 30 January 2015.

A Blue Angels member was sentenced to four months in prison in November 2015 after being convicted of assaulting his son's teacher during a parents' evening at a school in Aalst. The biker claimed the teacher was bullying his son.

In July 2017, a Blue Angels member from Zonnebeke was sentenced to three years in prison for car theft, drugs and weapons possession, and forgery of a license plate and driving license.

A former Blue Angels member who refused to return his "colours" to the club after he was expelled was left in intensive care after being stabbed in Sint-Katherina-Lombeek on 8 September 2018. Six club members were arrested afterwards, and police found firearms, explosives and narcotics in the subsequent search of the men's homes. A prospective member who was allegedly involved in the stabbing committed suicide at the Blue Angels clubhouse in Sint-Amandsberg a few days later. The remaining five suspects were charged with violent theft, attempted racketeering, gang building, and possession of prohibited weapons.

United Kingdom

England
A number of Blue Angels members were prosecuted following an arson attack on the home of Leeds motorcycle garage owner Paul Malham which took place on 30 April 2006. In July 2007, Malham was shot and wounded with a crossbow at his home in Boston Spa by Paul Miller, who was allegedly contracted by the Blue Angels to kill Malham. Miller was sentenced to sixteen months in prison in March 2008. Paul Moody, the co-owner of the motorcycle shop with Malham, was knocked unconscious in a hammer attack carried out by a group of unidentified men at a bikers' gathering near Scarborough in September 2010.

Four Blue Angels members – David Hansbury, David Torr, Steven Clayton and Martin Booth – pleaded guilty to threatening behavior relating to an incident on 27 July 2018 in which they forced a member of the Mongrel Mob to hand over his "colours" at his home in the Beeston area of Leeds. The victim had previously been a member of the Blue Angels and served as the club's European secretary before being expelled in 2015 and warned against associating with any other motorcycle club in future. In January 2019, Torr, Clayton and Booth were sentenced to community service while Hansbury was made the subject of a two-month electronically tagged curfew order.

Scotland

In the 1960s, the most senior of Glasgow's gangs began organising protection rackets, shebeens and prostitution rings, and battled for control over such operations. The Blue Angels garnered a "notoriously violent" reputation when the club was involved in fights with mod gangs and various street gangs including the Maryhill Fleet. These conflicts typically involved bar brawls "of John Wayne proportions" which were followed by a series of revenge attacks, including petrol bombings on bars and cafes. In September 1964, a mass brawl involving hundreds of gang members in Glasgow city centre resulted in a Blue Angel being sentenced to life in prison. The gang wars ultimately ended when respective leaders met to organise a truce. Members of the Roadburners and Garthamlock Blackhawks gangs subsequently joined the Blue Angels.

The Blue Angels have alleged links to organised crime. The club became associated with Glasgow crime boss Walter Norval after Norval's daughter Rita married Blue Angels member William Gunn. Gunn was sentenced to five years in prison for threatening a witness in Norval's November 1977 armed robbery trial. Blue Angels bikers served as pallbearers at Norval's funeral in August 2014.

The Blue Angels were reportedly involved in a biker war with the Tayside chapter of the Satans Slaves in 2011.

Actor and musician Charlie Allan was hospitalised after he was allegedly beaten outside a hotel in Stirling in June 2012 by two members of the Blue Angels who accused him of assisting the Outlaws in founding a chapter in Dundee the previous year. The Blue Angels were involved in an effort to stop the Outlaws recruiting in Scotland at the time.

A turf war involving the Blue Angels and the Nomads – a club formed in Aberdeen in 1966 – started after the Blue Angels expanded into Aberdeenshire by "patching over" the Road Mutts and Tribe 21 clubs. The biker war reportedly started partially for control over the organisation of lucrative motorcycle festivals. The conflict led to a string of violent attacks. On 28 September 2013, a Blue Angels member refeuling his motorcycle at a petrol station in Aberdeen was beaten with a baseball bat and a metal bar by Nomads members Gavin Blair, Alistair Thomson and Alexander Mackie who then fled the scene in a car. After being chased along the A90 road by approximately thirty to forty Blue Angels members on motorcycles, the Nomads were the victims of an attack at Foveran. Blair, Mackie and Roberts were ordered to carry out 200 hours of unpaid work in April 2014 after pleading guilty to assault.

Around twenty masked Blue Angels members armed with hammers and metal bars allegedly tried to gain entry to the clubhouse of a rival club in the Moredun area of Edinburgh, on 11 August 2018. The clubhouse was destroyed in a petrol bomb attack in the early hours of the following morning. A seriously injured man was rescued from the burning building by firemen. Blue Angels biker Adam Andrews, who suffered a broken leg, a broken back and a collapsed lung while carrying out the attack, was imprisoned for three years after being convicted of wilful fire-raising at Glasgow High Court on 23 March 2021.

On 8 September 2018, Blue Angels member Ian Ewing used his Vauxhall Insignia to collide with Nomads biker Colin Sutherland, causing Sutherland to fall from his motorcycle on the A98 road near Cullen, Moray. Ewing and a group of unidentified accomplices then attacked Nomads members Colin Sutherland, John Sutherland, Edward Forrest and Nicky Syratt with a claw hammer, a tyre iron and a baseball bat. The attack was allegedly carried out in retaliation for members of the Blue Angels being assaulted earlier that day. Ewing was arrested shortly afterwards in possession of a hammer and an item of clothing bearing the slogan: ""Blue Angels North East". On 3 February 2020, he was convicted at the High Court in Edinburgh of attempting to murder Colin Sutherland, assaulting John Sutherland to his severe injury and permanent disfigurement, and assaulting Forrest and Syratt to their severe injury and the danger of their lives. Co-accused Patrick Noble was acquitted on the same charges after the jury returned not proven verdicts, while charges were dropped against Kyle Urquhart and Ian Yeomans. Ewing was sentenced to seven years in prison on 15 April 2020.

References

External links
 
 Blue Angels MC Belgium
Blue Angels MC West Coast
Blue Angels MC South East 
Blue Angels MC Kirklees
Blue Angels MC Spain

Organizations established in 1963
1963 establishments in Scotland
Clubs and societies in Glasgow
Outlaw motorcycle clubs
Motorcycle clubs in the United Kingdom
Gangs in Belgium
Gangs in England
Gangs in Scotland
Crime in Glasgow
Maryhill